Grandy Creek is a stream in the U.S. state of Washington. The creek was named after John Grandy, a pioneer settler.

See also
List of rivers of Washington

References

Rivers of Skagit County, Washington
Rivers of Washington (state)